The FIBA Asia Cup (formerly the FIBA Asia Championship and ABC Championship) is an international basketball tournament which takes place every four years between the men's national teams of Asia and Oceania.

Through the 2015 edition, the tournament took place every two years and was also a qualifying tournament for the FIBA World Cup and the Olympic basketball tournament. However, since 2017, the tournament was renamed the FIBA Asia Cup and now includes teams from FIBA Oceania. Also, it was the first to be played on a new four-year cycle, and is no longer a part of the qualifying process for the World Cup or the Olympics.

History

Beginnings: Philippines/Japan dominance
The Asian Basketball Confederation (ABC) Championship was inaugurated in Manila in 1960. The championship was held to find Asia's best team and for qualification to the World Championship and the Olympics. On the next four tournaments, the Philippines won 3 with the Japanese beating the Filipinos on 1965. Korea, Japan and the Philippines split the next 3 championships until China debuted on 1975 at Bangkok with the championship, where they have dominated for 40 years.

Chinese dominance
Right after the Philippines had started sending amateur players when the Philippine Basketball Association was establish in 1975 as the first professional basketball in Asia and refused to lend the country's best players, China emerged as the new dominant country in Asian basketball.

From 1975 to 2007, there were only two instances where China did not win the championship. In 1985, the Philippines defeated a full-strength Chinese team, which were by then five-time defending champions, in the championship round. The Chinese then won every game in the championship until 1997, where they to lost to South Korea in the semi-finals where they complained about the climate in Riyadh. The Koreans beat the Japanese in the final, but the Chinese would then start a championship streak of four tournaments, led by Yao Ming.

Renaming
By 2005, the tournament had been renamed as the FIBA Asia Championship; in that year's tournament in Doha, the Chinese easily won against the Lebanese in the final. During the 2007 championship, the Chinese did not send their "A" team since they had already qualified to the Olympics by virtue of hosting it. In this championship, West Asian teams started to compete with the traditional East Asian powers, as evidenced of an all-West Asian final when Iran defeated Lebanon. In 2009, Iran defeated the Chinese team A in the 2009 final to become only the 3rd team to successfully defend the championship. The 2009 championship started a streak of finals contested between a team from the Middle East and a team from the Far East; in 2011, Iran was eliminated by Jordan in the quarterfinals, which would then lose to hosts China by one point in the final. The 2013 championship would be the first to be hosted outside East Asia since 2005 in the Philippines, the hosts, emerged as finalists; China had been eliminated by Chinese Taipei in the quarterfinals, which were then defeated by the Iranians, who then beat the Filipinos in the Final.

Removal of qualification status
As FIBA implemented a new cycle and tournament format, the 2013 FIBA Asia Championship held in Manila and the 2015 FIBA Asia Championship held in Changsha were the last Asian Championships to serve as qualification to either the FIBA Basketball World Cup and the Olympic Games, respectively.
The 2017 FIBA Asia Championship marked firsts and lasts for the Asian Championship, as it was the first Asian Championship as a standalone tournament, meaning it did not serve as the qualifier for either the Basketball World Cup or the Olympic Games. The 2017 tournament was the last Asian Championships to be ever held under a 2-year cycle. After 2017, the Asian Championships and the FIBA Oceania Championship merged into a tournament to be known as the FIBA Asia Cup. It was held every 4 years like the EuroBasket, AfroBasket and AmeriCup, which are held 2 years before/after the FIBA World Cup.

Qualification
Qualification is via the different FIBA Asia subzones. The East, Gulf, Southeast and West subzones receive two berths each, while the Central and South zones get one each. The host and the champion from the preceding FIBA Asia Cup also get a berth each. Each subzone conducts a qualification tournament up to a year before the championship to determine the qualifying teams. The other four berths are distributed to the subzones in reference to their performance in the previous year's FIBA Asia Cup, with the subzone receiving an extra berth for each team in the top four excluding the champion and the host.

Tournament format
There had been a variety of tournament formats used before. Most were similar to the format of two group stages and a knockout stage. The current format, as first applied in 2017, is a multistage tournament. The 16 teams are grouped in four groups in the preliminary round. The teams play against each other once; the top team will directly advance to the quarterfinals, and the second placed teams will play an elimination game between the third placed team of another group. The four winning teams of the elimination games will advance to the quarterfinals. After the elimination games, the knock-out phase will follow.

The classification games will be conducted as follows:
 13–16th place games are for the teams eliminated from the group phase.
 The 9th to 12th place games are for the losing teams of the elimination games.
 The 5–8th place games are for the eliminated teams in the quarterfinals.

Summary

Medal table

Tournament awards
Most recent award winners (2022)

Tournament leaders
 Minimum of five games played (GP).

All-time

Highest scoring averages

Cumulative top scorers

Per tournament

Points

Rebounds

Assists

Participating nations

20th century

21st century

General statistics
All-time statistics, as of the 2022 FIBA Asia Cup.

Notes

See also
 Basketball at the Summer Olympics
 Basketball at the Asian Games
 FIBA Basketball World Cup
 FIBA Asia Challenge
 FIBA Asia Under-20 Championship
 FIBA Asia Under-18 Championship
 FIBA Asia Under-16 Championship
 FIBA Asia Women's Cup

References

 
Basketball
Basketball competitions in Asia between national teams
Recurring sporting events established in 1960
1960 establishments in Asia
Quadrennial sporting events
Asia Cup